Glasgow Anniesland is a constituency of the Scottish Parliament (Holyrood), being one of eight constituencies within the Glasgow City council area. It elects one Member of the Scottish Parliament (MSP) by the plurality (first past the post) method of election. It is also one of nine constituencies in the Glasgow electoral region, which elects seven additional members, in addition to nine constituency MSPs, to produce a form of proportional representation for the region as a whole.

In the first election to the Scottish Parliament the seat was won for Labour by Donald Dewar who subsequently became the first First Minister of Scotland. Since the 2011 Scottish Parliament election the MSP has been Bill Kidd of the Scottish National Party.

Electoral region 

The other eight constituencies of the Glasgow region are Glasgow Cathcart, Glasgow Kelvin, Glasgow Maryhill and Springburn, Glasgow Pollok, Glasgow Provan, Glasgow Shettleston, Glasgow Southside and Rutherglen.

The region covers the Glasgow City council area and a north-western portion of the South Lanarkshire council area.

Constituency boundaries 

The Glasgow Anniesland constituency was created at the same time as the Scottish Parliament, in 1999, with the name and boundaries of an  existing Westminster constituency. In 2005, however, Scottish Westminster (House of Commons) constituencies were mostly replaced with new constituencies.

Boundary review 

Following their First Periodic review of constituencies to the Scottish Parliament the Boundary Commission for Scotland had recommended alterations to the existing Anniesland constituency boundaries.

The electoral wards used to create the newly formed Anniesland are:

In full: Garscadden/Scotstounhill, Drumchapel/Anniesland
In part: Partick West (shared with neighbouring Glasgow Kelvin)

Member of the Scottish Parliament

Election results

2020s

2010s

2000s

1990s

See also
 Politics of Glasgow

References

External links

Constituencies of the Scottish Parliament
Politics of Glasgow
Scottish Parliament constituencies and regions from 2011
1999 establishments in Scotland
Constituencies established in 1999
Scottish Parliament constituencies and regions 1999–2011
Drumchapel